Dellamora curticauda is a species of beetle in the genus Dellamora. It was discovered in 1949.

References

Mordellidae
Beetles described in 1949